Hemoglobin, alpha pseudogene 1, also known as HBAP1, is a human gene.

References

Further reading

Pseudogenes